Blonde Redhead is the debut studio album by American alternative rock band Blonde Redhead. It was released on July 19, 1994 by Smells Like Records.

Track listing

Personnel
Credits are adapted from the album's liner notes.

Blonde Redhead
 Kazu Makino – guitar, vocals
 Amedeo Pace – guitar, vocals
 Simone Pace – drums
 Maki Takahashi – bass

Additional personnel
 Ari Marcopoulos – photography
 Steve Shelley – production
 John Siket – mixing
 Skúli Sverrisson – bass on "Girl Boy"
 Mark Venezia – recording

References

External links
 
 

1994 debut albums
Blonde Redhead albums